This article lists the winners of the yearly awards in the Scottish Professional Football League (SPFL).

List of award winners 

The awards have been handed out by the Scottish Professional Football League (SPFL) since the 2015–16 season. The awards are voted for by members of the Scottish media, with a Manager and Player of the Year selected for each of the four divisions of the Scottish Professional Football League (SPFL) at the end of every season.

Tartan Ball and Boot 
The Tartan Ball and Boot awards were awarded in 2018–19 (the only season to date) by the Scottish Professional Football League (SPFL) and are produced by the official SPFL matchday ball supplier, Mitre. The Tartan Ball is awarded to the highest goalscorer in each of the four SPFL divisions (Premiership, Championship, League One, and League Two). The Tartan Boot is awarded to the highest overall goalscorer of all four divisions.

See also
List of Scottish Professional Football League monthly award winners
Scottish Football League yearly awards
Scottish Premier League Yearly Awards

References 

Scottish Professional Football League
Awards
Scottish Professional Football League
Awards established in 2016